Cozens is an English surname. Following the Norman Conquest of England in 1066, the name Cozens was first found in Britina. It was a name for a person who was related to someone of note in the area. Further research showed the name was derived from the Old French, cusin, and the Old English, cousin, which means relative.

Notable people with the surname include:

 Alexander Cozens (1717–1786), British landscape painter
 Charles Cozens (1784–1863), Canadian politician
 Chris Cozens (born 1982), British freestyle swimmer
 Dylan Cozens (baseball) (born 1994), American baseball player
 Dylan Cozens (ice hockey) (born 2001), Canadian ice hockey player
 Fred Cozens (1890–1954), American basketball coach
 John Cozens (footballer) (20th century), English professional footballer
 John Cozens (musician) (1906–1999), English-Canadian musician 
 John Robert Cozens (1752–1797), English draftsman and painter
 Lewis Cozens (1909–1968), British railway historian and author
 Peter Cozens (21st century), New Zealand businessperson
 Spencer Cozens (born 1965), musician, writer and producer

References

See also
 Cozens-Hardy
 Luke F. Cozans (1836–1903), New York lawyer and politician

English-language surnames